Cyclotrachelus furtivus is a species of woodland ground beetle in the family Carabidae. It is found in North America.

References

Further reading

 

Pterostichinae
Articles created by Qbugbot
Beetles described in 1853